Lawrence Gordon (born March 25, 1936) is an American producer and motion picture executive. He specializes in producing action-oriented films and other genres. Some of his most popular productions include 48 Hours (1982), Predator (1987), Die Hard (1988), Die Hard 2 (1990), Predator 2 (1990), Point Break (1991), Boogie Nights (1997), Lara Croft: Tomb Raider (2001), and Prey (2022).

Life and career
Gordon was raised in a Jewish family in Belzoni, Mississippi. He graduated from Tulane University in New Orleans. After moving to Los Angeles he began his producing career in 1964 working for Aaron Spelling and became writer and associate producer on the TV series Burke's Law. He quickly moved up the ranks and worked as an executive producer at ABC and at Screen Gems.

In the 1970s he was a key executive at American International Pictures and received credit as executive producer on John Milius's Dillinger (1973). He left as worldwide production head in 1973 to produce his first solo production, Hard Times (1975) for Columbia Pictures. In 1978 he had two high-grossing films with Hooper and The End, both starring Burt Reynolds.

Gordon and Walter Hill were going to make The Last Gun. Financing fell through so they made The Warriors instead.

In the early 1980s, he created the TV series Matt Houston.

Gordon worked on multiple films in the 1970s and 1980s with fellow producer Joel Silver, most notably Streets of Fire and 48 Hrs.

Gordon was President of 20th Century Fox from 1984 to 1986. He was planning to reactive Lawrence Gordon Productions on the Fox lot in order to receive a two-year independent production deal with the studio.

In 1989, he produced Field of Dreams which received an Academy Award nomination for Best Picture.
He subsequently formed Largo Entertainment which was backed by the Japanese company JVC.

Gordon also had an independent production deal with Universal Pictures under the name Lawrence Gordon Productions. Under Lawrence Gordon Productions, he produced Jumpin' Jack Flash, Boogie Nights, Mystery Men, K-9, the Lara Croft: Tomb Raider franchise, and Watchmen.

For three years, from 1986 until its founding of Largo in 1989, Lawrence Gordon Productions was based at 20th Century Fox, sometimes heading under the name Gordon Company.

Selected filmography
He was a producer in all films unless otherwise noted.

Film

Miscellaneous crew

Thanks

Television

As writer

References

External links
 

1936 births
Living people
Film producers from Mississippi
American film studio executives
20th Century Studios people
20th-century American Jews
People from Belzoni, Mississippi
People from Yazoo City, Mississippi
Tulane University alumni
21st-century American Jews